"Heartbreak Hurricane" is a song written by Larry Cordle and Jim Rushing, and recorded by American country music artist Ricky Skaggs.  It was released in December 1989 as the third single from the album Kentucky Thunder.  The song reached No. 13 on the Billboard Hot Country Singles & Tracks chart.

Chart performance

Year-end charts

References

1990 singles
Ricky Skaggs songs
Songs written by Larry Cordle
Songs written by Jim Rushing
Song recordings produced by Steve Buckingham (record producer)
Song recordings produced by Ricky Skaggs
Epic Records singles
1989 songs